Phomopsis sclerotioides is a fungal plant pathogen infecting cucurbits.

References

External links
 USDA ARS Fungal Database

Fungal plant pathogens and diseases
Vegetable diseases
sclerotioides